The Ministry of Urban Development and Housing is a cabinet ministry of the Government of Sri Lanka responsible for housing and construction. The ministry is responsible for formulating and implementing national policy on housing and construction and other subjects which come under its purview. The current Minister of Urban Development and Housing is Prasanna Ranatunga. The ministry's secretary is Mr. R M Abyeratne.

Ministers

Secretaries

References

External links
 

Urban Development and Housing
 
Urban Development and Housing
1953 establishments in Ceylon